Dunlap may refer to:

Places
In the United States
 Dunlap, California, an unincorporated town in Fresno County
 Dunlap, Illinois, a village
 Dunlap, Indiana, a census-designated place
 Dunlap, Iowa, a city
 Dunlap, Kansas, a city
 Dunlap, Missouri, an unincorporated community
 Dunlap, Ohio, a census-designated place
 Dunlap, Tennessee, a city
 Dunlap, Philadelphia, Pennsylvania, a neighborhood
 Dunlap, Seattle, Washington, a neighborhood

Elsewhere
 David Dunlap Observatory, Richmond Hill, Ontario

People
Dunlap Exclusive (born 1983), musical artist
Dunlap (surname)

See also 
 Dunlop (disambiguation)